Floyd Richard Lagercrantz, or Lagerkrantz, (9 January 1915 – 4 October 1977) was a Swedish footballer who most notably played as a forward for AIK. He was capped twice for the Sweden national team in 1938, scoring three goals.

Career statistics

Club

International

Scores and results list Sweden's goal tally first, score column indicates score after each Lagercrantz goal.

References

1915 births
1977 deaths
Swedish footballers
Sweden international footballers
Association football forwards
Enskede IK players
AIK Fotboll players
People from Västervik Municipality
Sportspeople from Kalmar County